National Understanding Front of Afghanistan (Jabha-ye Tafahom-e Melli-ye Afghanistan) was an alliance of opposition parties in Afghanistan. It was founded in April 2005, with the intention of jointly contesting elections. It did however become inactive within a couple of months. Yunus Qanuni was the main leader of the front.

Members of the front were:

New Afghanistan Party
People's Islamic Unity Party of Afghanistan
Islamic Rule Party of Afghanistan
Islamic Movement of Afghanistan
National and Islamic Unity Party of Afghanistan
National Independence Party of Afghanistan
Islamic and National Revolution Movement of Afghanistan
Islamic Organisation "Young Afghanistan"
National and Islamic Moderate Party of Afghanistan
Peace and National Unity Party of Afghanistan
National Unity Party of the Tribes of Afghanistan
National Solidarity Movement of Afghanistan (joined in May 2005)

Three individual presidential candidates joined the front, Abdul Hafeez Mansoor, Mir Mahfouz Neda'i and Latif Pedram. But the latter two left after two weeks.

Sources

Defunct political party alliances in Afghanistan